Eulamprotes kailai is a moth of the family Gelechiidae. It was described by Peter Huemer and Ole Karsholt in 2013. It is found in Kazakhstan, Kyrgyzstan and Russia (Buryatia, Tuva).

References

Moths described in 2013
Eulamprotes